Danish Aslam is an Indian film director based in Mumbai.

Career
Before making his debut as a director, Aslam assisted on films like Fanaa (2006), Ta Ra Rum Pum, Thoda Pyaar Thoda Magic, Being Cyrus, Salaam Namaste and Swades.

He is the director of Voot's most successful series It's Not That Simple, featuring Swara Bhaskar and the 2017 web series Timeout . He also directed the 2020 web series Flesh for Eros Now. 

In 2021, he directed an episode on  Feels Like Ishq written by Sulagna Chatterjee that revolves around a queer couple.

Filmography

Director

Actor

References

External links
 
 

Living people
21st-century Indian film directors
Year of birth missing (living people)
Film directors from Mumbai
Jamia Millia Islamia alumni